Sa 'yo Lamang (Only Yours) is a 2010 Filipino religious-family drama film produced and released by Star Cinema. It is Star Cinema's offering for its 18th anniversary.

Synopsis
From the director who gave us Tanging Yaman, Laurice Guillen, is back with another heart-warming family drama which teaches us about love, faith and life. Sa ‘yo Lamang stars Christopher de Leon, Lorna Tolentino, Bea Alonzo, Coco Martin, Enchong Dee, Miles Ocampo, Shaina Magdayao and Empress Schuck.

Plot
Dianne seems to have a happy family. She and her mom just bought a house for them, her younger siblings are doing great at school, and her boyfriend of two years is already preparing for their future together. But everything in her life shatters when her dad, Franco, returns after ten years of being with his mistress. More than the irritating presence of Franco, what hurts Dianne the most is how her mom wholeheartedly accepts Franco back to live with them again, and how her siblings allow him to be their father again, as if he never left. Confused and hurt, Dianne does everything to throw Franco out of their lives. But as she succeeds with her plans, she is shocked to learn that their family's problem is more than the return of the man who has hurt her in the past. And thus the start of the journey of Dianne and her family as they discover their family's secrets.

Cast and characters

Main cast
Christopher de Leon as Franco Alvero - Franco is the father of Dianne, Coby, James and Lisa and also Amanda's husband.
Lorna Tolentino as Amanda Alvero - Amanda is the mother of Dianne, Coby, James and Lisa and also Franco's wife.

Supporting cast
Bea Alonzo as Dianne Alvero - Dianne is Amanda and Franco's first daughter and first child also.
Coco Martin as Coby Alvero - Coby is Amanda and Franco's first son and second child.
Enchong Dee as James Alvero - James is Amanda and Franco's 2nd son. He is Amanda's 4th child, however, he is Franco's 3rd child.
Miles Ocampo as Lisa Alvero - Lisa is Amanda's 3rd daughter, Franco's 4th child and Amanda's 5th child.
Shaina Magdayao as Karen - Karen is Coby's love interest.
Zanjoe Marudo as John - John is Dianne's future husband.
Diether Ocampo as Paul - Paul is Dianne's ex-boy friend.
Lauren Young as Lorraine - Lorraine is James' love interest.
Empress Schuck as Agnes - Agnes is Amanda's 2nd daughter but 3rd child.

Special Participation
Dominic Ochoa as Father Eric - He is the Alvero family friend.
Igi Boy Flores as Kennedy - He has a crush on Lisa.
John Manalo as young Coby Alvero - He has a crush on Dianne

Reception

Reviews
This film is graded A by the Cinema Evaluation Board of the Philippines and rated PG-13 by the Movie and Television Review and Classification Board. The film lead the nominations in 27th PMPC Star Awards for Movies, having thirteen nominations, but the film failed to win any of the awards. The Film Academy of the Philippines awarded Lorna Tolentino the Best Actress of the year award during the 29th Luna Awards.

Soundtrack
The official theme song titled Sa 'Yo Lamang, is sung by Juris together with the Ars Cantica Ensemble. The official music video was directed by Cathy Garcia-Molina.

International screenings
The film had international screenings on September 17, 2010, in select cities in the United States such as Las Vegas, NV, San Francisco, CA, Los Angeles, CA, San Diego, CA, Seattle, WA, Honolulu, HI, Bergenfield, NJ, Milpitas, CA, Chicago, IL. It will also have screenings in Ontario, Alberta and Vancouver in Canada, and Guam.

Box office
The film grossed ₱20 million on its first week falling at number two behind Despicable Me. Within the film's 4th week, it had grossed a total of ₱48 million.

Awards

References

External links
 Sayo Lamang Official Movie Website
 Star Cinema Multiply Website
 Official Movie Multiply Website

2010s Tagalog-language films
Star Cinema films
Star Cinema drama films
Philippine legal films
Films about religion
2010 films
Films about Filipino families
Philippine drama films
Films directed by Laurice Guillen